Thomas Rawlinson may refer to:

 Thomas Rawlinson (1647–1708), London winemaker, Lord Mayor of London 1705
 Thomas Rawlinson (barrister) (1681–1725), English barrister and bibliophile
 Thomas Rawlinson (industrialist), 18th-century English industrialist controversially reputed to have invented the modern kilt
 Thomas Rawlinson (died 1769), Lord Mayor of London 1753
 Thomas Rawlinson (politician) (1847–1928), English-born Australian politician

See also
 Rawlinson